Racing Club Épernay Champagne is a French football club based in the commune of Épernay.

The club plays in the Championnat National 3 after winning promotion in 2020. Its kit colours are white and sky blue. It plays its home matches at the Stade Paul Chandon in Épernay.

History
The club was founded in 1906. It was promoted from the Division d'Honneur Champagne-Ardenne in 2016–17 as champions and played in Championnat National 3 for two seasons from 2017–18 to 2018–19, before being relegated back to the Champagne-Ardenne regional league.

References

Association football clubs established in 1906
1906 establishments in France
Sport in Marne (department)
Football clubs in Grand Est